Period (stylized as period) is a Japanese manga series written and illustrated by Sakumi Yoshino. It was serialized in Shogakukan's seinen manga magazine Monthly Ikki from June 2003 to September 2014, with its chapters collected in five wideban volumes. Period is Yoshino's last manga series, who died in April 2016.

Publication
After a four-year hiatus from June 25, 2010, the series resumed publication on April 25, 2014, and finished on September 25 of the same year, when the magazine ceased its publication. Shogakukan collected its chapters in five wideban volumes, released from May 28, 2004, to November 28, 2014. Period is Yoshino's last manga series, who died on April 20, 2016, at 57. Its five volumes were digitally available on MangaONE from July 21–24, 2016.

Volume list

References

External links
 

Seinen manga
Shogakukan manga